Keep the Ball Rolling is the fourth studio album by Bryn Haworth. Two of the tracks - "Luxury Liner" and ""Standing on the Rock" - feature Cliff Richard on backing vocals. Haworth had previously worked with Richard on his 1978 Small Corners album.

Track listing
All tracks composed by Bryn Haworth; except where indicated
 "Keep the Ball Rolling"         
 "First Time"         
 "Let Me Love You"         
 "Standing on the Rock"         
 "City Boy"         
 "Party Girl"         
 "Luxury Liner"         
 "Unchained Melody" (Alex North, Hy Zaret)       
 "Unemployment Blues"         
 "Working for Love"

Personnel

 Bryn Haworth - guitar, vocals
 Simon Morton – percussion
 Tony Rivers – backing vocals on "Let Me Love You"
 Henry Spinetti – drums
 Chris Stainton – piano on "Keep the Ball Rolling", organ on "Standing on the Rock" and "Unemployment Blues"
 Pete Wingfield – keyboards 
 John Perry – backing vocals on "Keep the Ball Rolling" and "Let Me Love You"
 Dave Markee – bass
 Bud Beadle – baritone saxophone 
 Stuart Calver – backing vocals  on "Let Me Love You"
 Mel Collins – saxophone, flute
 Jim Cuomo – saxophone
 Martin Drover – trumpet, flugelhorn  
 Steve Gregory – flute, saxophone
 Terry Hellyer – trombone 
 Cliff Richard – backing vocals on "Standing on the Rock" and "Luxury Liner"
 Ted Astley - string arrangements
 Lyle Harper - brass arrangements

References

Bryn Haworth albums
Albums produced by Jon Astley
A&M Records albums
1979 albums
Albums recorded at Olympic Sound Studios